So Near, So Far (Musings for Miles) is a 1993 album by jazz saxophonist Joe Henderson and is the second of five albums he recorded with Verve Records near the end of his career. The album is a tribute to Miles Davis, who Henderson greatly admired (and with whom he performed for a few weekends in 1967). The songs were written by (or associated with) Davis, and the featured musicians (guitarist John Scofield, bassist Dave Holland and drummer Al Foster) played with Davis earlier in their careers.

Track listing 
All compositions by Miles Davis except where noted.
"Miles Ahead" (Davis, Gil Evans) – 4:31
"Joshua" (Davis, Victor Feldman) – 6:18
"Pfrancing (No Blues)" – 8:18
"Flamenco Sketches" (Davis, Bill Evans) – 9:37
"Milestones" – 5:57
"Teo" – 8:56
"Swing Spring" – 8:10
"Circle" – 6:07
"Side Car" – 10:26
"So Near, So Far" (Tony Crombie, Bennie Green) – 4:30
Digitally recorded at Power Station, NYC, October 12–14, 1992.

Personnel
Joe Henderson – tenor saxophone
John Scofield – guitar
Dave Holland – bass
Al Foster – drums
Don Sickler, Richard Seidel – producers
Joe Henderson – co-producer

Chart performance

References 

1993 albums
Joe Henderson albums
Verve Records albums
Miles Davis tribute albums
Grammy Award for Best Jazz Instrumental Album